Liao Jen-lei (born 30 August 1993) is a Taiwanese baseball pitcher. He has played in Nippon Professional Baseball for the Saitama Seibu Lions.

Early life
Liao was born in Taoyuan, Taiwan on 30 August 1993, to parents who played baseball and softball. He attended  in Japan, and graduated from Kainan University in his hometown of Taoyuan.

Career
Liao signed with the Pittsburgh Pirates of Major League Baseball in January 2014. He pitched for the Gulf Coast Pirates, primarily as a reliever, for two seasons and was subsequently released. While in the Pirates organization, Liao appeared in the 2015 Asian Baseball Championship as a member of the Chinese Taipei national baseball team. Following his release, Liao returned to Japan, where he had attended high school, and was selected by the Yomiuri Giants in the seventh round of the 2016 Nippon Professional Baseball draft. Because Liao had pitched in Minor League Baseball, the Giants filed a petition for him to gain rookie status, which was granted in January 2017. Liao spent two years pitching with the Giants affiliate in the Eastern League. He was placed on the Chinese Taipei preliminary roster for the 2018 Asian Games, but withdrew from the competition. Liao signed with the Saitama Seibu Lions in December 2018. Liao's signing was formally announced by the team in January 2019. Liao was promoted to the first team on 31 March 2019, and debuted on 3 April 2019.

Liao returned to his native Taiwan in 2019 and appeared in the Asia Winter Baseball League. The next season, he trained with the Chinatrust Brothers farm team. He declared for the mid-season Chinese Professional Baseball League draft that year. He was selected by the Wei Chuan Dragons as a bonus pick.

References

External links

1993 births
Living people
Saitama Seibu Lions players
Taiwanese expatriate baseball players in Japan
Nippon Professional Baseball pitchers
Baseball players from Taoyuan City
Gulf Coast Pirates players
Taiwanese expatriate baseball players in the United States
Wei Chuan Dragons players